Albert Benschop (10 May 1949, Rijswijk - 27 February 2018) was a Dutch sociologist with the University of Amsterdam's faculty of Social and Behavioral Sciences. He was the chief editor of the university's SocioSite project. His internet studies are published in the Peculiarities of Cyberspace.

Biography 
Benschop received a master's degree in sociology and psychology at the Vrije Universiteit Amsterdam early 1970s. In 1972 he made name as leader of the SRVU Students' union of the Vrije Universiteit Amsterdam, which occupied the main building of the Vrije Universiteit during the student protests that year.

Since 1973 Benschop has been a lecturer and researcher at the department of Sociology at the Universiteit van Amsterdam. In the late 1990s he founded the SocioSite website, which is considered to be one of the world's most consulted social-science websites.

Publication list (partial)
English
 Classes - Outline of a Transformational Class Analysis , Summary, 1993
 Virtual Communities, Networks of the future, November 1997
 Web History, Building blocks of a historical-sociology of the internet, October 1997
 Learning at Distance, Building Blocks of a Web Sociology, 1997–1998
 NetLove and CyberSex, The (im)possibilities of bodiless intimacy, December 1997
 Sociology of Skywriting, The Internet as a medium and object of sociological research, 1998
 Death in Cyberspace, Funeral and mourning practices on the internet, July 2003
 Child Pornography in Cyberspace, Traces of Crimes, August 2003
 Flash Mob: Happening for Internetters, Swarming and the Future of Inexplicable and Smart Mobs, August 2003
 Flash Mob, Happening for Internetters, August 2003
 Regulation of CyberPorno, Moral and technological filters, social control and criminal prosecution, October 2003
 CyberStalking, Menaced on the internet, October 2003
 The future of the semantic web , Making content understandable for computers, April 2004
 Peer-to-peer: Networks of unknown friends , The power of sharing, March 2004
 Chronicle of a Political Murder Foretold, Jihad in the Netherlands, November 2005
 Jihadists running Wild(ers), I saw this film a long time ago, Mei 2008
 The Peculiarities of Second Life, The insatiable desire to start your life anew, September 2008
 Online Morality, Decency and Justice, Internet as a digital pillory, May 2009
 Egypt: Revolting with and without internet, Repression and Revolt in a military dictatorship, June 2011

Dutch
 Kwetsbare Slimme Woningen - Hoe veilig is mijn thuisnetwerk?, 24 November 2016.
 Slimme Autos Hacken - Hoe veilig zijn onze (semi)autonome voertuigen?, 22 November 2016.
 Verhitte cyberoorlog in 2016 - — Digitaal wapengekletter tussen Rusland en de VS, 5 November 2016.
 ISIS en het Cyberkalifaat - — Internet als arena voor jihad, 15 Juni 2016.
 E-stonia - Contouren van een gevirtualiseerde samenleving, January 2016.
 Cyberoorlog - Slagveld internet [2013] Uitgeverij De Wereld, Tilburg.
 NetActivisme en WolkBewegingen, Een wereld die te winnen is. November 2011 – 2013
 Naar een nieuwe economische sociologie, 1996–2011
 Klassen - Ontwerp van een transformationele klassenanalyse, 1993–2013
 De klassentheorie van Marx, 1990–2011
 Max Weber’s bijdrage aan de theorie van sociale ongelijkheid en klassen, 1987–2011

References

External links
 Dr. Benschop's publication list

1949 births
2018 deaths
Dutch sociologists
Academic staff of the University of Amsterdam
University of Amsterdam alumni
Vrije Universiteit Amsterdam alumni
People from Rijswijk